Archedinskaya is a rural locality (a stanitsa) in Mikhaylovka Urban Okrug, Volgograd Oblast, Russia. The population was 1,344 as of 2010. There are 37 streets.

Geography 
Archedinskaya is located 28 km southwest of Mikhaylovka. Poddubny is the nearest rural locality.

References 

Rural localities in Mikhaylovka urban okrug
Don Host Oblast